Samuel Dexter Hastings (July 24, 1816 – March 26, 1903) was an American merchant, banker, real estate dealer, activist, legislator and reformer from Wisconsin who served two one-year terms in the Wisconsin State Assembly.

Background 
Hastings was born in Leicester, Massachusetts, on July 24, 1816, to Simon and Betsey Hastings. He is a descendant of the 17th century Massachusetts colonist Thomas Hastings.  He moved to Philadelphia, Pennsylvania, where he took part in the anti-slavery movement. In 1846, he moved to the Wisconsin Territory, settling in Geneva.

Public office 
In 1849 Hastings he was elected as a Free Soiler, succeeding Democrat Erasmus Richardson. In January he introduced a series of bills calculated to force the hand of Democrats and Whigs, both of which parties were courting the newly successful Free Soilers with an eye towards merger. The "Hastings resolutions", as they came to be called, urged Wisconsin's Representatives and instructed its Senators (then elected by the Legislature) to apply their power and influence to completely break with slavery: to forbid the admission of new slave states, to ban slavery in all federal territories, and to repeal any laws that favored slave labor over free. The tensions revealed by the votes of all three parties on these and related resolutions would eventually lead the Free Soilers to conclude that merger with either of the old parties was an illusion unworthy of pursuit. He was succeeded in the 1850 session by Alexander S. Palmer, a Democrat.

Hastings moved to La Crosse, Wisconsin, and later to Trempealeau.

In 1857, he was again elected to the Assembly, this time as a Republican. He served as Wisconsin State Treasurer from 1858–1866, and as a trustee of the State Hospital for the Insane, and in similar positions for other state bodies headquartered in Madison.

In 1884, Hastings (long involved with the temperance movement) ran as the Prohibitionist candidate for Governor of Wisconsin, and in 1892 as a Prohibitionist candidate for the Assembly from Madison.

Civic activism 
He was a founding member of the Wisconsin Academy of Sciences, Arts and Letters, and later served as Treasurer of that body.

Hastings argued against the idea that the introduction of the wine-drinking habit into the United States would be a preventative for drunkenness.

He died March 26, 1903 at his daughter's home in Evanston, Illinois. Some of his papers are in the holdings of the Wisconsin Historical Society.

References

1816 births
1903 deaths
American abolitionists
American bankers
American merchants
American temperance activists
Businesspeople from Wisconsin
Members of the Wisconsin State Assembly
People from Leicester, Massachusetts
Businesspeople from Philadelphia
State treasurers of Wisconsin
Wisconsin Free Soilers
19th-century American politicians
Wisconsin Republicans
Wisconsin Prohibitionists
Politicians from Philadelphia
People from Geneva, Wisconsin
19th-century American businesspeople